Piranha Bytes GmbH is a German video game developer based in Essen. Founded in 1997, it is best known for their Gothic and Risen series of role-playing video games. The studio is a subsidiary of THQ Nordic and, as of August 2021, employs 33 people.

History 
Alex Brüggemann, Michael "Mike" Hoge, Stefan Nyul, and Tom Putzki founded Piranha Bytes in Bochum in 1997, incorporating it as Piranha Bytes Software GmbH. In 1999, the company became a wholly owned subsidiary of the German publisher Phenomedia. Piranha Bytes' first game, Gothic, was released in 2001. Shortly thereafter, Brüggemann left the company to work on smaller game projects, eventually designing The Settlers: Rise of an Empire. He died on 19 January 2013 after a long illness.

Following a financial scandal at Phenomedia, the parent company filed for insolvency in May 2002. Piranha Bytes' management performed a management buyout, concluded in September that year, and transferred the studio's trademarks and intellectual property, including the rights to the Gothic series, to Pluto 13 GmbH, a new entity that assumed "Piranha Bytes" as its trading name. Only one of the four original founders remained with the new incorporation.

On 22 May 2019, THQ Nordic announced that it had acquired the studio to undisclosed terms. At the time, Piranha Bytes had 31 employees in its Essen offices. Through the acquisition, the company was reincorporated as Piranha Bytes GmbH. By June that year, it had 32 employees.

Games developed

References

External links 
 

2019 mergers and acquisitions
Companies based in Essen
German companies established in 1997
THQ Nordic divisions and subsidiaries
Video game companies established in 1997
Video game companies of Germany
Video game development companies